Culprit 1 a.k.a. Culprit One (born James Hannam, 1980) is a British, London-based DJ, remixer and electronica producer. He is considered 'The DJ Shadow of Wales' by BBC Radio 1 and 'The Bastard Son of Orbital and RJD2' by XFM.

Hannam holds a degree in music from the Royal Welsh College of Music and Drama and attended Crosskeys College in the Welsh valleys, where the Manic Street Preachers also studied. His music has been broadcast on BBC Radio 1 by Steve Lamacq, Zane Lowe, Bethan Elfyn, Annie Mac, Annie Nightingale, Colin Murray and Huw Stephens (who contributed sleeve notes to first album 'Running in Order'). Eddy Temple-Morris, Adam Walton and Radio 101 (Croatia) have also supported Culprit 1 releases.

"What I Use", the first recording made under the Culprit 1 moniker, was released in July 2003 on Boobytrap. Hannam went on to perform at the American South by Southwest event and subsequently signed to Exceptional Records.

Following popular events with a string quartet early in 2007 (two members of which also performed with Kanye West on his 2006 UK tour), he found favour in the classical music world, earning the support of influential UK radio station Classic FM.

In November 2010, Exceptional released Hannam's second album Theme 2, featuring vocal contributions from Smiler, Polarbear and Iko.

Discography

Remix discography

Other information
 Unusually for a producer in a traditionally serious and publicity-shy genre, Hannam maintains an amusing, tongue-in-cheek journal and Facebook group, in which he regularly describes his studio experiments, vegetarian recipes and journeys back to Wales.
 A couple that met at the debut Culprit 1 performance in October 2003, married in 2008.
 The name Culprit 1 was influenced by a graffiti scrawling at Newport bus station.
 At Bettws High School in Newport, Hannam won the 1992 Eisteddfod keyboard solo competition with a rendition of 2 Unlimited's European hit "No Limits".
 Hannam's first job after graduating from university was a club reviewer for the UK dance magazine Muzik. The editor at the time was Conor McNicholas, who later became editor of the music  magazine NME.

References

External links
 Culprit 1 Official website
 Culprit 1 Official MySpace page
 Culprit 1 biography from BBC Wales
 Beatportal interview, May 2007
 Western Mail interview, June 2007

British record producers
1980 births
Living people